Korvac is the name of a fictional character appearing in American comic books published by Marvel Comics. He first appears in Giant-Size Defenders #3 (Jan. 1975) and was created by Steve Gerber and Jim Starlin.

Publication history
Michael Korvac debuted in Giant-Size Defenders #3 (1975) with no first name given, and according to creator Gerber: "The character really was a throwaway, created for one story. And I never intended to bring him back, because, among other things, I hated the name! I still think it sounds more like a vacuum cleaner than a villain".

However, Roger Stern and Len Wein felt that Korvac, being a native of the 31st century, made a natural adversary for the Guardians of the Galaxy, and wrote a story in Thor Annual #6 (1977) which was intended to set him up in that role. The Guardians of the Galaxy's own series, Marvel Presents, was cancelled before Thor Annual #6 was published, cutting off Stern's plans to use Korvac there. Korvac instead appeared in Avengers #167, 168, 170–177 (January–November 1978), later called the "Korvac Saga". The issues in this storyline were written by Jim Shooter and David Michelinie, with art by George Pérez and David Wenzel.

A trade paperback edition reprinted the Korvac Saga in 1991, and included a new epilogue written by Mark Gruenwald and drawn by Tom Morgan. Although the revised conclusion cast Korvac as a villain, it was removed by editor Tom Brevoort when reprinted as Avengers Legends Volume 2: The Korvac Saga in 2003.

Korvac reappeared briefly in Avengers Annual #16 (1987). He is heavily referenced in a 1991 summer annual crossover storyline: Fantastic Four Annual #24 (1991); Thor Annual #16 (1991); Silver Surfer Annual #4 (1991) and Guardians of the Galaxy Annual #1 (1991). The character returned in Captain America vol. 3, #17–19 (May–July 1999).

Korvac also appeared in both volumes of the alternate universe title What If?, in issues #32 (April 1982) and vol. 2, issue #36 (April 1992). Korvac made a return to the mainstream 616 universe in Avengers Academy #11 (March 2011).

To tie-in with the movie Captain America: The First Avenger, an all-ages retelling of the Korvac Saga was issued in December 2010 and ended in March 2011 titled Captain America: The Korvac Saga. The story was condensed and focused primarily on Captain America journeying to the future in pursuit of Korvac with the help of Nikki and Firelord.

Fictional character biography
Michael Korvac is a computer technician in the alternate universe Earth-691. When the Solar System and its colonies are conquered by the alien Badoon in AD 3007, Korvac becomes a collaborator and traitor to the human race. Caught asleep at a machine while working, the Badoon punish Korvac by grafting his upper body to a machine, effectively making him a cyborg. Korvac is then transported through time by the Elder of the Universe the Grandmaster, who utilizes him as a pawn in battling the hero Doctor Strange and the Defenders.

It is eventually revealed that Korvac deliberately lost the fight so he can be able to discreetly scan and analyze the Grandmaster's cosmic power. Gaining several new abilities from this analysis, Korvac then kills his Badoon masters and plans to conquer the cosmos. Korvac recruits a group of aliens called the "Minions of Menace" and attempts to cause Earth's Sun to go nova, but is defeated by the Guardians of the Galaxy and the time-traveling Thunder God Thor.

During "The Korvac Saga" storyline, Korvac flees across time and space to the Earth-616 universe. Upon arrival, Korvac discovers the space station of the entity Galactus. While attempting to download the knowledge of Galactus from the station into his own system, Korvac is imbued with the Power Cosmic and becomes god-like. Korvac then recreates himself as a perfect humanoid form, and posing as a human called "Michael", travels to Earth with the intent of reshaping it into a utopia. Korvac, however, is pursued by the Guardians of the Galaxy, who join forces with the superhero team the Avengers in a bid to stop the villain.

Guardian member Starhawk finds Korvac and battles him in secret. Korvac, however, disintegrates Starhawk and then recreates him, but removes from the hero the ability to perceive Korvac in any way so as to avoid future detection. The Elder of the Universe known as the Collector foresees the coming of two beings that would be capable of challenging the Elders (Korvac and Thanos), and remakes his own daughter Carina into a being of incredible power to use as a weapon against them. Carina does meet Korvac, but the two fall in love and she begins to sympathize with him. The Collector is defeated by the Avengers after a failed bid to "collect" and protect the heroes from Korvac, who upon discovering the Collector's plot disintegrates the Elder.

Iron Man eventually tracks Korvac to a residential neighborhood in Forest Hills Gardens, in Queens, New York City, New York. The entire Avengers roster, aided by the heroine Ms. Marvel, and the Guardians of the Galaxy, confront Korvac and Carina, who pose as a middle class couple. Korvac's deception is revealed when Starhawk states he cannot see the man called "Michael". Realizing that he has been discovered, and that cosmic entities such as Odin and the Watcher are now aware of his existence, Korvac is forced into battle.

Korvac slays wave after wave of heroes, and is finally caught off guard and weakened by Captain America and Wonder Man. Although able to kill the heroes, Korvac is weakened further by the combined efforts of Starhawk, Iron Man, the Vision and Thor. Sensing that Carina now doubts him, Korvac commits suicide through an act of will. An angered Carina attacks the surviving heroes, but is finally slain by Thor. The entire battle is watched by part-time Avenger Moondragon, who realizes that Korvac only wanted to help mankind, with his dying act being to restore the Avengers and Guardians to life. Korvac's and Carina's souls then passed into the realm of Death where they are watched over by Master Order and Lord Chaos.

It is revealed during "The Korvac Quest" storyline that Korvac discarded his power when near death after sensing that Galactus had activated the weapon the Ultimate Nullifier in retaliation for his previous intrusion. Korvac's suicidal act of will preserves his power and consciousness, which is sent forward through time to inhabit various descendants of his. Starhawk becomes aware of this, and the Guardians of the Galaxy pursue Korvac's essence through time. The power eventually reaches the year 2977 AD and inhabits Michael's father, Jordan, who is killed in battle with the Guardians. Jordan's widow, Myra, vows to teach the infant Michael that the Guardians were responsible for his father's death on the day of his birth.

Korvac is briefly resurrected in human form by the Grandmaster to battle Silver Surfer. When Korvac's attempt to use Captain America in a scheme to steal the power of a Cosmic Cube from Red Skull ultimately failed, Red Skull used his internalized Cube power to scatter Korvac across six dimensions.

In Avengers Academy, Korvac's wife Carina was mistakenly resurrected by Veil (believing that she is helping to resurrect Wasp). Korvac returns for her and Hank Pym offers to return Carina to Korvac, but she refuses to go with him, choosing nonexistence over him (even though she is apparently immortal, as is her father). A battle commences pitting Korvac against all current Avengers teams. He is weakened by them and then attacked by adult versions of the Academy's students. After a brutal battle, Veil phases into his body, which temporarily paralyzes Korvac, and Hazmat then completely annihilates Korvac with a projected blast of anti-matter.

Korvac was later obtained by the Enclave gave him the code name of Adam IV. He was originally supposed to be used by Enclave in their plans for world domination only for Korvac to break free from them and called them arrogant for not planning for a better universe.

One year later, Korvac assumed the alias of a scientist named "Fuller Tiehard" and attended a party held by Tony Stark at his brownstone in the Lower East Side where he talked to him about harnessing electricity for an energy source. When Iron Man and Hellcat went on patrol and found Unicorn stealing the Gutenberg Bible, Korvac witnessed the fight. After Unicorn was defeated, Korvac caused a lightning bolt to strike Iron Man enough to destroy the Gutenberg Bible. Iron Man later went to visit "Fuller Tiehard" at his cabin near Tiehard Lightning Site I to see how his project works. As he is given a tour, he is suddenly struck by pink lightning. Tony then sees that Korvac has Unicorn, Blizzard, and Controller at his side while mentioning his plans to become a demigod with the energies of the Earth that he'll harvest while selecting which of Iron Man's enemies to deal with him. Hellcat shows up where she rams Korvac and Unicorn before helping Iron Man fight Blizzard and Controller. When Unicorn recovers, he joins the fight and calls Korvac the "Other." Iron Man and Hellcat fight off the villains as Korvac recovers and blasts them with lightning while saying "So says Korvac." Iron Man recovered, but Hellcat remains still. Upon hearing that Iron Man survived the attack, Korvac, Blizzard, Controller, and Unicorn captured James Rhodes so that Iron Man wouldn't interfere. Then they went to Galactus' Worldship Taa II where Korvac started to absorb the electrical grid of New York City to become more powerful. Iron Man and Hellcat work on a plan to rescue James starting with them recruiting the deaf mutant Halcyon. To rescue James Rhodes from Korvac, Iron Man, Hellcat, and Halcyon recruit Gargoyle, Scarlet Spider, Misty Knight, and Frog-Man to aid them. While shaving off his goatee, Korvac is told by Unicorn that Guardsman is in position. He then proceeds to work on persuading Hellcat to her side upon her hearing her voice. When confronted on the streets by Korvac, Hellcat electrocutes herself. When Iron Man confronts Korvac at the waterfront, Korvac states that he is only taking over the universe with good intentions while the others arrive at the Shi'ar jumpship that Korvac was using. When Misty Knight and those with her are apparently killed in the explosion, Iron Man lashes out against Korvac and fights him until his armor suffers from mobility issues. Korvac calls up Blizzard, Controller, and Unicorn telling them that they will leave in 10 minutes and to thank Guardsman for the false ship. After Korvac kicks Iron Man in the neck, his armor's A.I. B.O.S.S. warns Tony about a cervical fracture and the dangers of hypoxia. Korvac then walks away stating to Iron Man that everything will be beautiful.

After a few more ordeals, Korvac reached and entered the transmutation chamber in Taa II and gained cosmic power, forcing Iron Man to do the same. Now cosmic-powered giants, the two battled until the Abstract Entities of the universe detained Korvac, who swore to make the departing Tony his new primary focus.

Powers and abilities
Korvac was originally a normal man until the Badoon amputated the lower half of his body and grafted his upper body and nervous system onto a specialized computer module capable of siphoning energy from virtually any source. Korvac's mechanical module could also tap and synthesize any form of energy and concealed advanced weaponry. After downloading information from Galactus' ship and acquiring the Power Cosmic, Korvac is capable of energy projection, matter alteration, teleportation, astral projection, and manipulation of time and space. In his perfect human form, Korvac retained all his cosmic abilities and could use these to achieve virtually any effect. Michael Korvac is also a brilliant computer scientist, a master strategist, and a formidable hand-to-hand combatant.

In other media

Television
 Michael Korvac appears in a self-titled episode of The Avengers: Earth's Mightiest Heroes, voiced by Troy Baker. This version is a modern-day human who gained powers from the Kree after they abducted and experimented on him. While Korvac escaped, he was driven insane and killed thousands of sentient beings across the universe over the course of two years. While being pursued by the Guardians of the Galaxy, Korvac crash-lands on Earth and is taken to Avengers Mansion to receive help from the Avengers. Upon meeting the Wasp, Korvac briefly mistakes her for his beloved, Corrina, before telling her what happened to him. Wasp later finds Corrina and brings her to Korvac. When the Guardians arrive to capture Korvac, the other Avengers attempt to stop them until Star-Lord explains the truth about their quarry. An enraged Korvac attacks and defeats both teams while Corrina attempts to reason with him. Realizing how horrified she was of him, a regretful Korvac leaves Earth.
 A variation of Korvac appears in the Ultimate Spider-Man episode "Guardians of the Galaxy", voiced by James Marsters. This version is an intergalactic warlord and leader of the Chitauri. Taking notice of Earth's heroes, Korvac sets out to destroy the planet before they can stop him. However, the Guardians of the Galaxy, Nova, and Spider-Man foils his plans.
 A variation of Korvac appears in the Guardians of the Galaxy episode "Unfortunate Son", voiced by Wil Wheaton. This version is a humanoid alien scientist who was in love with the A.I. Rora until he turns himself into an A.I. system for his personal space station after Rora was taken by J'son. After mistaking him for J'son, Korvac takes Star-Lord and his fellow Guardians of the Galaxy hostage to turn them into his robotic slaves. While he did the same to J'son, Star-Lord helps his team and J'son escape while Rora destroys Korvac's space station.

Video games
 Michael Korvac appears as a playable character in Lego Marvel's Avengers.
 Michael Korvac appears in Lego Marvel Super Heroes 2.

References

External links
 
 

Characters created by Jim Starlin
Characters created by Steve Gerber
Comics characters introduced in 1975
Fictional characters who can manipulate reality
Fictional characters who can manipulate time
Fictional warlords
Guardians of the Galaxy characters
Marvel Comics cyborgs
Marvel Comics scientists
Marvel Comics supervillains